Steve McBride is a Northern Ireland barrister and former politician.

Career
McBride is active in the Alliance Party of Northern Ireland (APNI). He became the Chairman of APNI in the 1990s, and in 1996 was elected to the Northern Ireland Forum, representing Belfast South. At the 1997 general election, McBride took 12.9% of the vote and fourth place in the Westminster seat of Belfast South. At the 1998 Northern Ireland Assembly election he narrowly missed out on a seat, despite coming third on first preference votes in the six seat constituency.

References
Steve McBride bio
McBride statement on framework document, APNI

Living people
High Sheriffs of Belfast
Alliance Party of Northern Ireland politicians
Members of the Northern Ireland Forum
Year of birth missing (living people)
Place of birth missing (living people)